Mangelia tenuicostata is a species of sea snail, a marine gastropod mollusk in the family Mangeliidae.

Description
The length of the shell attains 7 mm.

Distribution
This species occurs in European waters, the Mediterranean Sea and in the Atlantic Ocean off the Cape Verdes and West Africa.

Fossils have been found in the Plaisancien strata of Orciano, Italy.

References

 M.A. Peyrot, 1931–1932, Conchologie néogénique de l'Aquitaine, t. VI. (Actes Soc. Linn. Bordeaux, t. LXXXIILXXXIV, 1931–1932)
 Gofas, S.; Le Renard, J.; Bouchet, P. (2001). Mollusca, in: Costello, M.J. et al. (Ed.) (2001). European register of marine species: a check-list of the marine species in Europe and a bibliography of guides to their identification. Collection Patrimoines Naturels, 50: pp. 180–213
 Rolán E., 2005. Malacological Fauna From The Cape Verde Archipelago. Part 1, Polyplacophora and Gastropoda.

External links

tenuicostata
Gastropods described in 1862
Molluscs of the Atlantic Ocean
Molluscs of the Mediterranean Sea
Gastropods of Cape Verde